KBA may refer to:
The Korea Basketball Association
The Koenig & Bauer AG
Knowledge-based authentication of a person accessing a service
Kenn Borek Air, an airline based in Calgary, Alberta, Canada, ICAO code
Key Biodiversity Area